Reuel Denney (April 13, 1913 in New York City – May 1, 1995 in Honolulu) was an American poet and academic.

Life
Denney grew up in Buffalo, New York. He graduated from Dartmouth College in 1932.  He taught at the University of Chicago. He was professor emeritus, at University of Hawaii, retiring in 1977.

His papers are at the Rauner Special Collections Library at Dartmouth College.

Awards
 1939 Yale Series of Younger Poets Competition

Works
 The Connecticut River, and other poems, Yale University Press, (1939), (reprint 1971), winner of the Yale Younger Series Award.
  The Lonely Crowd, Reuel Denney, David Riesman, Nathan Glazer, (1950), (reprint 2001), a classic of American sociology.
 
 
 In Praise of Adam (1965)
   (reprint)

Anthologies

 A new anthology of modern poetry, Selden Rodman (ed), The Modern Library, 1946

References

1913 births
1995 deaths
Dartmouth College alumni
Writers from New York City
Yale Younger Poets winners
20th-century American poets